Fordoun (Pronounced "For-Dun") is a parish and village in Aberdeenshire, Scotland.  Fothirdun (possibly "the lower place"), as it was historically known, was an important area in the Howe of the Mearns.  Fordoun and Auchenblae, together with their immediate districts form the Parish of Fordoun with the Parish Church in the vicinity of the original settlement, now absorbed by Auchenblae.

In the 19th Century Fordoun railway station was opened approximately 3 miles to the South East of Fordoun Church and the original settlement.  A village grew at the site of the station (opened in November 1849 and closed in June 1956), where there were also a number of shops, but only a seasonal farm shop remains. In the time since the founding of the railway station the village formerly known as Fordoun Station has come to be known simply as Fordoun and the site of the original settlement has been absorbed by Auchenblae.

People from Fordoun

 John of Fordun (d. c. 1384), Scottish Chronicler was born in the Parish of Fordoun.
 George Wishart (ca.1513 – 1546) a Scottish Protestant Reformer and one of the early Protestant martyrs burned at the stake as a heretic.
 John Wishart of Pitarrow (died 1576), a son of John Wishart of Cairnbeg in Fordoun parish, and comptroller of the Scottish exchequer. 
 James Burnett, Lord Monboddo (1714–99), judge on the Court of Session lived at Monboddo House. He was author of The Origin and Progress of Man and Language, a study of evolution that predated the work of Charles Darwin.
 James Beattie (1735–1803), Scottish scholar and writer was born in Laurencekirk and first worked as schoolmaster in Fordoun.  He became Professor of Moral Philosophy and Logic at Marischal College and is noted for his Essay on the Nature and Immutability of Truth (1770) and poem The Minstrel. 
 Alexander Hamilton (1739-1802) co-founder of the Royal Society of Edinburgh, one of the first doctors to recognise the infectious nature of puerperal fever.

History

There is a Pictish symbol stone, the Fordoun Stone (also known as St. Palladius' Stone), in the parish church on the outskirts of Auchenblae at NO726784

In his 1819 Geography, James Playfair notes that
Fordoun is a mean town, and the seat of a presbytery, noted for being the birthplace or temporary residence of John Fordoun, author of the Scotichronicon; and of Palladius, who was sent by Pope Celestine into Scotland, in the 5th century, to oppose the Pelagian heresy. The chapel of Palladius, adjacent to the church, is 40 by 18 feet; at the corner of the minister's garden there is a well still called Paldy's well; and an Annual fair in the neighbourhood is styled Paldy-fair.

North of the village is a disused airfield that was active during World War II. A two-runway satellite for Peterhead airfield, Fordoun Aerodrome operated from 1942 to 1944.

Notes 

Villages in Aberdeenshire